H.O.T. (pronounced "H. O. T.", acronym for Highfive Of Teenagers) was a South Korean boy band that was created by SM Entertainment in 1996. They are considered to be the first K-pop idol group and their successful formula became the model for many K-pop groups that followed them. The group consisted of five members: Moon Hee-joon, Jang Woo-hyuk, Tony Ahn, Kangta, and Lee Jae-won.

H.O.T. sold over 6.4 million records in South Korea during their career. They were also commercially successful in China and Japan, and were among the first stars of the Korean Wave in Asia.

The group broke up in 2001 following a contract disagreement with SM Entertainment, prompting hundreds of fans to stage protests against the company.

Formation 
H.O.T. was formed in 1996 by record producer Lee Soo-man, the founder of SM Entertainment. Lee had polled high school students to find out what their ideal pop group would be like, and he used this information to create H.O.T.

The first member to join the group was Kangta, who Lee discovered at an amusement park. Next to join were friends and singing partners Moon Hee-joon and Lee Jae-won. The fourth to join was Jang Woo-hyuk who attracted Lee's attention after winning first place in a dance contest. Finally, Tony Ahn joined the group after auditioning for Lee in Los Angeles.

History

1996–97: Debut and breakthrough 
H.O.T. debuted in September 1996 with the album We Hate All Kinds of Violence, which was a success, selling 1.5 million copies. Their first single, "Descendants of Warriors," was a critique of schoolyard bullying, while their second single, "Candy", was a cheerful bubblegum pop song that established H.O.T.'s  popularity, especially among teenage girls. That year, H.O.T. won Best New Artist at the Golden Disc Awards.

In July 1997, H.O.T. released their second album, Wolf and Sheep, which sold 1 million copies in ten days. The album included the singles "Wolf and Sheep," "Happiness," and "We Are the Future," the first of which was banned from airplay due to its use of strong language. Nonetheless, the album was both commercially and critically successful, winning the Grand Prize at both the 1997 Golden Disc Awards and the 1997 Seoul Music Awards. Additionally, "We Are the Future" was nominated for an International Viewer's Choice Award at the 1998 MTV Video Music Awards. By this time, H.O.T. had become a "social sensation" in South Korea, and with their success came the rise of K-pop fan culture. In 1997, H.O.T. also released their first Chinese album, the sales of which helped the group survive the slump in South Korean record sales that followed the Asian financial crisis.

1998–99: Resurrection,  controversy and I Yah
H.O.T. released their third album, Resurrection, in September 1998. The album, which featured a variety of styles including hardcore hip hop, sold more than 1.1 million copies by the following year. At the 1998 Seoul Music Awards, Resurrection was awarded the Grand Prize, which it shared with Special Album by Sechs Kies. Netizens accused the album of plagiarism on account of alleged similarities between the album's lead single "Line Up!" and "Killing In The Name," a song by American rock band Rage Against the Machine. However, the song won the International Viewer's Choice Award for MTV Korea at the 1999 MTV Video Music Awards.

H.O.T. released a live greatest hits album in April 1999. On June 25, H.O.T. performed alongside Michael Jackson and popular South Korean girl group S.E.S. at a benefit concert in Seoul arranged by Jackson. In September 1999, H.O.T. released their fourth album, I Yah!. The album's title track was about a 1999 fire that killed kindergarten students at the Sealand Youth Training Center in South Korea. The album sold more than 1.3 million copies. Within that same month, H.O.T. became the first K-pop group to perform at the Seoul Olympic Stadium, where 72,000 fans saw them perform.

2000–01: Outside Castle, Age of Peace and disbandment
In February 2000, H.O.T. performed for 13,000 fans in Beijing at their first concert in China. The group became immensely popular among Chinese teenagers, and their success inspired S.M. Entertainment and other South Korean entertainment companies to promote their artists in China. H.O.T. released their fifth album, Outside Castle, in September 2000. That year, the group also starred in the sci-fi movie Age of Peace, in which they portrayed soccer players living in a futuristic society. Despite H.O.T.'s popularity at the time, the movie was not a hit.

H.O.T. announced its disbandment at a press conference in Seoul in May 2001. Members An, Lee and Jang told the press that they were leaving S.M. Entertainment because they could not come to an agreement with the company over a new contract. In the following days, hundreds of the group's fans protested outside of S.M. Entertainment headquarters. Some fans blocked roads and threw rocks at the company headquarters' windows to protest what they believed were unjust actions against H.O.T. on the part of S.M. Entertainment. It was later reported that the contractual disagreements between H.O.T. and S.M. Entertainment concerned the group members' pay, which was only about $10,000 USD for every 1 million albums they sold.

After the split, Kangta and Moon were offered lucrative contracts by S.M. Entertainment as solo artists. An, Lee and Jang signed to Yejeon Media and formed a three-member group called jtL, which experienced moderate success before they disbanded in 2003. All five former H.O.T. members have since pursued solo careers and are still active in the entertainment industry.

2018–2019: Reunion and later career
In February 2018, H.O.T. was featured on the South Korean variety show Infinite Challenge in the "Saturday, Saturday is for Singers" special, a recurring segment on the show which showcases famous singers from the 1990s and was notably responsible for the reunion of their first-generation counterparts Sechs Kies. All five members appeared on the show, marking their first appearance as a complete group since 2003.

During the years in between disbandment and the reunion, the possibility of a reunion had been repeatedly brought up. Following the successful reunions of their fellow first-generation groups g.o.d and Fly to the Sky in 2014, a Naver online poll revealed that H.O.T ranked first as the first-generation idol group K-pop fans most wanted to see again. In 2016 it was reported that the members had been in contact with one another and met with Lee Soo-man to discuss the possibility of reuniting for the 20th anniversary of their debut but it ultimately did not come to fruition.

On August 31, 2018, it was announced that H.O.T. would be independently holding their reunion concert, 'Forever [Highfive Of Teenagers]', on October 13 and 14 in Seoul Olympic Main Stadium with 100,000 attendees.

Discography

Studio albums

Live albums

Compilation albums

Singles

Guest album appearances
 Christmas In SMTOWN (1999)
 Christmas Winter Vacation in SMTown.com (2000)
 Christmas Winter Vacation in SMTown.com - Angel Eyes (2001)

Filmography
 Age of Peace (2000)

Concert and tours

1998 – H.O.T. The 1st Concert, Olympic Gymnastics Arena
1998.Feb.21 ~ Mar.31 – USA Live Tour, New York, Washington, Los Angeles, Hawaii
1999.Jan.22 ~ Feb.3 – H.O.T. The 2nd Concert, Seoul Sejong Center, Busan, Gwangju (65,400 attendees)
1999.Sept.18 – 99 Live In Seoul, Seoul Olympic Main Stadium  (45,000 attendees)
2000.Feb.1 – 2000 H.O.T. Live Concert In Beijing (15,000 attendees)
2001.Feb.27 – 2001 H.O.T. Live Concert – H.O.T. Forever, Seoul Olympic Main Stadium (80,000 attendees)
2018.Oct.13~14 – 2018 Forever [High-five Of Teenagers] Concert, Seoul Olympic Main Stadium (100,000 attendees)
2019.Sep.20~22 – 2019 [High-five Of Teenagers] NEXT MESSAGE Concert, Gocheok Sky Dome (60,000 attendees)

Awards

Listicles

See also
jtL

References

External links 

 Official website (archived) (in Korean)

SM Town
Grand Prize Golden Disc Award recipients
Grand Prize Seoul Music Award recipients
K-pop music groups
South Korean dance music groups
South Korean boy bands
Musical groups established in 1996
Musical groups disestablished in 2001
SM Entertainment artists
MAMA Award winners